Birmančević is a Serbian surname. Notable people with the surname include:

 Boban Birmančević (born 1969), Serbian politician
 Veljko Birmančević (born 1998), Serbian footballer

Serbian surnames